Charlie Cook was an American professional wrestler who competed in Southeastern regional promotions such as Mid-South Wrestling, Georgia Championship Wrestling and Florida Championship Wrestling as well as the National Wrestling Alliance during the 1970s and 1980s.

On August 11, 1981, Cook was placed in a match as a substitute for Jack Brisco. He defeated Dory Funk, Jr. to win the NWA Florida Heavyweight Championship. He dropped the title to Funk the following month. After regaining the belt, he later lost the title to The Spoiler. The following year, he held the WWC Caribbean Heavyweight Championship but dropped it to Abdullah the Butcher.

Cook was voted second runner up for Pro Wrestling Illustrated's Most Improved Wrestler of the Year award in 1981.

Charlie Cook died January 8, 2020.

Championships and accomplishmentsChampionship Wrestling from FloridaNWA Florida Heavyweight Championship (2 times)NWA Mid-AmericaNWA World Six-Man Tag Team Championship (1 time) – with George Gulas and Dennis HallNWA Tri-StateNWA Arkansas Heavyweight Championship (1 time)Southeastern Championship WrestlingNWA Alabama Heavyweight Championship (1 time)World Wrestling Council'
WWC Caribbean Heavyweight Championship (1 time)

References

Further reading

External links
Charlie Cook at Cagematch.net
Charlie Cook at Oklafan.com
Charlie Cook at Wrestlingdata.com

1941 births
2020 deaths
20th-century professional wrestlers
21st-century African-American people
African-American male professional wrestlers
American male professional wrestlers
NWA Florida Heavyweight Champions
People from Calhoun, Georgia